Maria Teresa Santillan is a former mayor of Lynwood, California, the first Latina mayor of the city.

Biography
Santillan was elected to the Lynwood City Council in 2003 after winning a recall election which ousted Paul Richards, a 17-year councilmember, 7-term mayor, and the 2nd African-American mayor of the city (Richard's remaining term ran through December 1, 2005). She was the first Latina to serve on the City Council. In November 2005, she was re-elected to a 4-year term on the City Council and in December 2005, she was named Mayor Pro Tem. In September 2007, she was the only council member to not face a recall election which resulted in the ouster of mayor Louis Byrd and council members Fernando Pedroza, Alfreddie Johnson Jr. and Leticia Vasquez over corruption allegations. In December 2007, she was appointed by the 5-member City Council to serve as mayor succeeding Louis Byrd. She was reappointed as mayor in 2008.

She was subsequently re-elected to the City Council in 2009 and 2013. She later served as mayor again from 2016 to 2017.

References

External links
Official Lynwood website profile

Living people
Mayors of places in California
Women mayors of places in California
People from Lynwood, California
Year of birth missing (living people)
Hispanic and Latino American politicians
Mayors of Lynwood, California
Hispanic and Latino American mayors in California
21st-century American women